Iraqi School Kuala Lumpur is a public school funded by the Iraqi government, located in the heart of Kuala Lumpur, Malaysia. The school is placed next to the current Iraqi embassy, but by 2011 the Iraqi embassy will be shifted to Putrajaya (Future capital of Malaysia) where a new building is being constructed. The current building of the embassy would be merged with the Iraqi school helping to provide more facilities.

Iraq–Malaysia relations